Clitterhouse Recreation Ground or Clitterhouse Playing Fields is a park and Site of Local Importance for Nature Conservation  in Brent Cross in the London Borough of Barnet. It is a large area of mown grass with a children's playground, bordered by thick hedges. Clitterhouse Stream (or Clitterhouse Brook), a tributary of the River Brent, runs along its eastern border.

The £4.5 billion Brent Cross Cricklewood development includes spending several million pounds on improving the park, including extensive landscaping, sports facilities and a nature park.

There is access to the park from Claremont Road, Prayle Grove, Purbeck Drive, Hendon Way, and by a subway from Ridge Hill.

See also

 Barnet parks and open spaces
 Nature reserves in Barnet

Notes

Further reading

Nature reserves in the London Borough of Barnet
Parks and open spaces in the London Borough of Barnet